Gregory James Broussard (born August 31, 1963), better known by his stage name Egyptian Lover, is an American musician, vocalist, producer and DJ, and was a part of the L.A. dance music, electro, and rap scene in the early 1980s.

History 
The Egyptian Lover was born in Los Angeles, California, and started out there as a DJ with Uncle Jamm's Army, DJing dances as large as the L.A. Sports Arena with 10,000 people. He began recording around Los Angeles in 1982 as a member of the Radio Crew, as well as Uncle Jamm's Army. Members of Uncle Jamm's Army and the World Class Wreckin' Cru, including Dr. Dre, The Unknown DJ, Egyptian Lover, Ice-T and Kid Frost would later go on to help define the early West Coast Hip-Hop sound throughout the 1980s.

Most of the Egyptian Lover's successful recordings were 12" singles. "Egypt, Egypt" was one of the most popular, which was called part of the "b-boy canon." He eventually released some of the earliest rap LPs, but they were less popular commercially than his singles. On the strength of an alternate mix of his most popular single "Egypt, Egypt", 1984's On the Nile was moderately successful, reaching the Billboard Top 200. It was called "one of the first hip-hop records to come out of the left coast". He also collaborated with several other hip-hop and dance music artists. After a break in the early 1990s, Egyptian Lover returned in 1994 with Back from the Tomb, his first full-length album in over ten years.

The Egyptian Lover also established his own record company, Egyptian Empire Records, which included artists such as Rodney O & Joe Cooley, 2 O'Clock & Te & Joezee.

His 2015 release, 1984, continues his tradition of using all analog equipment, including the Roland TR-808, along with much of the same gear used on his recordings of the 1980s. The name "1984" refers to his earlier albums. The album was recorded at Skip Saylor, Encore Studios, and at RUSK Studios, the same studio where On The Nile was recorded in 1984. It is widely available on double gatefold LP, CD and cassette tape.

2000s 
 2005 – New single "Party", backed with "Dancefloor"
 February 2006 – Platinum Pyramids was released
 End of 2006 – Recorded "UFO" and "Futuristic" with Jamie Jupiter for Jupiter's new 12" single (never released)
 2007 – Remade "Modernaire" by Dez Dickerson (from the film Purple Rain) for the label Citinite
 2007 – Collaborated with Clone Machine and Egypt Ear Werk
 December 2008 – Released exclusive songs on iTunes: "Electro Pharaoh", "Freaky D.J.", and "Scandinavian Summer"
 2008 – Joined Who Cares on the song "They Killed the Radio"
 2008 – Worked with Jamie Jones on the song "Galactic Space Bar"
 2008 – Worked with M.I.A. on "Rock off Shake off" for new artist Rye Rye
 May 2009 – Collaborated with Debonaire on "Do U Wanna Get Down?" for a new Street Sounds compilation
 May 2009 – New video "Freaky D.J." with producer/director Victor Brooks a.k.a. Who007
 2009 – New album that included songs "Electro Pharaoh", "U.F.O.", "Freaky D.J.", "BellyDance", "Scandinavian Summer", and "Do U Wanna Get Down?"
 June 2009 – Remix of James Pants's Cosmic Rapp was released
 2011 – work on new album entitled 1984 begins
 2014 – Collaborated with Dye on the song "She's Bad"
 2015 – 1984 released

Touring 
The Egyptian Lover began touring again in 2004 throughout Europe, Asia, and North America. His performances often begin with mixing records on turntables before segueing into his original compositions.

In 2008, he supported M.I.A. in her People vs. Money Tour.

Discography

Albums

EPs
 1984 – "Egypt, Egypt EP"
 2009 – "Electro Pharaoh"
 2009 – "James Pants Meets Egyptian Lover" (split 12" with James Pants)

Compilation albums
 2016 – 1983-1988

Charted singles

References

External links 
 Westcoastpioneers Biography page
 
 Egyptian Lover on MySpace

American rappers
American electro musicians
1963 births
Living people
Priority Records artists
DJs from Los Angeles
Record producers from California
African-American rappers
21st-century American rappers
21st-century African-American musicians
20th-century African-American people